, Koro's Big Day Out (lit. Koro's big walk), is a 2002 Japanese animated short film. Hayao Miyazaki of Studio Ghibli is the writer and director. The film is about Koro the puppy, who runs away from his mistress, experiences some adventures around town and who is finally happily returned home. The film was exclusively shown at the Ghibli Museum in Japan.

External links
 
 
 Koro's Big Day Out at Nausicaa.net

2000s animated short films
2002 anime films
Anime short films
Films directed by Hayao Miyazaki
2000s Japanese-language films
Studio Ghibli animated films
Films scored by Yuji Nomi